is a railway station on the Hōhi Main Line, operated by JR Kyushu in Chūō-ku, Kumamoto, Japan.

Lines

Layout 
The station consists of two side platforms serving two tracks at grade. The station building is a wooden structure of western design and houses a waiting area and a staffed ticket window. Access to the opposite side platform is by means of a footbridge.

Management of the station has been outsourced to the JR Kyushu Tetsudou Eigyou Co., a wholly owned subsidiary of JR Kyushu specialising in station services. It staffs the ticket booth which is equipped with a POS machine but does not have a Midori no Madoguchi facility.

Adjacent stations

History
On the same day, this station was opened with the name  as one of several intermediate stations along the track. On 2 December 1928, the entire track from Kumamoto to Ōita was designated as the Hōhi Main Line. On 1 May 1940, the station was renamed Minami-Kumamoto. With the privatization of Japanese National Railways (JNR), the successor of JGR, on 1 April 1987, the station came under the control of JR Kyushu.

Passenger statistics
In fiscal 2016, the station was used by an average of 970 passengers daily (boarding passengers only), and it ranked 170th among the busiest stations of JR Kyushu.

See also
List of railway stations in Japan

References

External links
Minami-Kumamoto (JR Kyushu)

Railway stations in Kumamoto Prefecture
Railway stations in Japan opened in 1914